Głuszyńskie is a lake in Poland near the city of Radziejów in the Kuyavian-Pomeranian Voivodship.

Lakes of Kuyavian-Pomeranian Voivodeship
Radziejów County